After the Morning is the debut release by American pianist John Hicks recorded in 1979 and released on the West 54 label. Two earlier sessions led by Hicks were released on Strata-East Records following this album.

Reception
Allmusic awarded the album 4½ stars stating "This first album is a real keeper. Great piano playing throughout.

Track listing
All compositions by John Hicks except as indicated
 "After the Morning" 	
 "Serenata" (Leroy Anderson)	
 "Dierdre de Samba"	
 "Some Other Spring" (Arthur Herzog, Jr., Irene Kitchings)	
 "The Duke" (Dave Brubeck)	
 "Impact"	
 "Until the Morning"	
 "Night Journey"

Personnel
John Hicks - piano
Walter Booker - bass (tracks 1, 3, 6 & 8)
Cliff Barbaro - drums (track 6)

References

West 54 Records albums
John Hicks (jazz pianist) albums
1979 albums